Charlie Phillips may refer to:

 Charlie Phillips (American football) (born 1952), retired American football safety
 Charlie Phillips (footballer) (1910–1969), Welsh international footballer
 Charlie Phillips (ice hockey) (1917–2005), Canadian ice hockey defenceman
 Charlie Phillips (photographer) (born 1944), Jamaican-born restaurateur, photographer, and documenter of black London
 Charlie Phillips (documentary films) (born 1980), head of documentary acquisition and production at The Guardian
 Charlie Phillips (singer) (born 1937), American country music singer

See also
 Charles Phillips (disambiguation)